Marta Kostyuk defeated Varvara Gracheva in the final, 6–3, 7–5 to win the singles tennis title at the 2023 ATX Open. It was her first WTA Tour title.

This was the first edition of the tournament.

Seeds

Draw

Finals

Top half

Bottom half

Qualifying

Seeds

Qualifiers

Lucky loser

Qualifying draw

First qualifier

Second qualifier

Third qualifier

Fourth qualifier

Fifth qualifier

Sixth qualifier

References

External links 
 Main draw
 Qualifying draw

2023 WTA Tour